Workers for the Good Lord is a 2000 French crime comedy-drama film written and directed by Jean-Claude Brisseau, starring Stanislas Merhar, Raphaële Godin, Emil Abossolo-Mbo, Paulette Dubost and Coralie Revel. The film was chosen by Cahiers du Cinéma as one of the 10 best pictures of 2000.

Plot
Elodie, tired of her husband Fred's generous ways, endangering the family's finances, dumps him when he gets fired. Emotionally devastated, he turns into a modern Robin Hood, robbing a post office to help a beggar, and escapes in a stolen car with Sandrine, who has long had a crush on him. They meet Maguette, an African prince turned into a penniless exile. Together the three head south.

Cast

Critical reception
Lisa Nesselson of Variety described the film as "a radical genre pastiche", "over the top", "extravagantly lensed, socio-romantic experiment" adding, "It's so bad it's good."

References

External links
 
 
 

2000 films
2000 crime drama films
2000 comedy-drama films
2000s crime comedy-drama films
2000s French-language films
Films directed by Jean-Claude Brisseau
Films shot in France
French crime comedy-drama films
2000s French films